Christine Palau (11 June 1930 – 26 November 2014) was a French gymnast. She competed in the women's artistic team all-around at the 1948 Summer Olympics.

References

External links
 

1930 births
2014 deaths
French female artistic gymnasts
Olympic gymnasts of France
Gymnasts at the 1948 Summer Olympics
Gymnasts from Paris
20th-century French women